KZBR (97.1 FM, The Zebra) is a radio station broadcasting an adult hits music format. Licensed to La Jara, Colorado, United States, the station is currently owned by William Spears, Jr., through licensee Wolf Creek Broadcasting, LLC.

References

External links

ZBR